Em Câmara Lenta is a 2012 Portuguese film directed by Fernando Lopes.

Cast
Rui Morrison
João Reis
Maria João Bastos
Maria João Luís

References

External links

Portuguese drama films
Films based on Portuguese novels
2012 films
Films produced by Paulo Branco